Bodianus or the hogfishes is a genus of fish in the family Labridae found in the Atlantic, Indian and Pacific Ocean. These species have many parasites.

Species
There are currently 45 recognized species in this genus:
 Bodianus albotaeniatus (Valenciennes, 1839)
 Bodianus anthioides (E. T. Bennett, 1832) (Lyre-tail hogfish)
 Bodianus atrolumbus (Valenciennes, 1839) (Pale-bar hogfish) 
 Bodianus axillaris (E. T. Bennett, 1832) (Axil-spot hogfish)
 Bodianus bathycapros M. F. Gomon, 2006 
 Bodianus bennetti M. F. Gomon & F. M. Walsh, 2016 (Lemon-striped pygmy hogfish) 
 Bodianus bilunulatus (Lacépède, 1801) (Tarry hogfish)
 Bodianus bimaculatus G. R. Allen, 1973 (Two-spot hogfish)
 Bodianus busellatus M. F. Gomon, 2006 
 Bodianus cylindriatus (S. Tanaka (I), 1930)
 Bodianus diana (Lacépède, 1801) (Diana's hogfish)
 Bodianus dictynna M. F. Gomon, 2006 (Red-fin hogfish) 
 Bodianus diplotaenia (T. N. Gill, 1862) (Mexican hogfish)
 Bodianus eclancheri (Valenciennes, 1846) (Harlequin hogfish)
 Bodianus flavifrons M. F. Gomon, 2001 (Masked hogfish) 
 Bodianus flavipinnis M. F. Gomon, 2001 (Yellow-fin hofish) 
 Bodianus frenchii (Klunzinger, 1879) (Fox hogfish)
 Bodianus insularis M. F. Gomon & Lubbock, 1980 (Island hogfish)
 Bodianus izuensis Araga & Yoshino, 1975 (Striped hogfish)
 Bodianus leucosticticus (E. T. Bennett, 1832) (Lined hogfish)
 Bodianus loxozonus (Snyder, 1908) (Black-fin hogfish)
 Bodianus macrognathos (R. E. Morris, 1974) (Giant hogfish)
 Bodianus macrourus (Lacépède, 1801) (Black-banded hogfish)
 Bodianus masudai Araga & Yoshino, 1975
 Bodianus mesothorax (Bloch & J. G. Schneider, 1801) (Split-level hogfish)
 Bodianus neilli (F. Day, 1867) (Bay of Bengal hogfish)
 Bodianus neopercularis M. F. Gomon, 2006 
 Bodianus opercularis (Guichenot, 1847) (Black-spot hogfish)
 Bodianus oxycephalus (Bleeker, 1862) 
 Bodianus paraleucosticticus M. F. Gomon, 2006 
 Bodianus perditio (Quoy & Gaimard, 1834) (Golden-spot hogfish)
 Bodianus prognathus Lobel, 1981
 Bodianus pulchellus (Poey, 1860) (Spot-fin hogfish)
 Bodianus rubrisos M. F. Gomon, 2006 (Red-sashed hogfish) 
 Bodianus rufus (Linnaeus, 1758) (Spanish hogfish)
 Bodianus sanguineus (D. S. Jordan & Evermann, 1903) (Sunrise hogfish)
 Bodianus scrofa (Valenciennes, 1839) (Barred hogfish)
 Bodianus sepiacaudus M. F. Gomon, 2006 (Crescent-tail hogfish) 
 Bodianus solatus M. F. Gomon, 2006 
 Bodianus speciosus (S. Bowdich, 1825) (Black-bar hogfish)
 Bodianus tanyokidus M. F. Gomon & Madden, 1981
 Bodianus thoracotaeniatus Yamamoto, 1982
 Bodianus trilineatus (Fowler, 1934) (Four-line hogfish)
 Bodianus unimaculatus (Günther, 1862) (Red hogfish)
 Bodianus vulpinus (J. Richardson, 1850) (Western hogfish)

References

 
Extant Miocene first appearances
Labridae
Marine fish genera
Taxa named by Marcus Elieser Bloch